Sterling Grist Mill Complex is a historic grist mill complex located at Sterling in Cayuga County, New York.  The complex consists of a frame mill building built about 1835, the rubble foundation of an 1859 tannery, and a dam and penstock built about 1900.  The mill building is built with a hand-hewn heavy timber frame sheathed in narrow pine clapboard.

It was listed on the National Register of Historic Places in 2002.

References

External links

Grinding mills on the National Register of Historic Places in New York (state)
Industrial buildings completed in 1835
Dams completed in 1900
Buildings and structures in Cayuga County, New York
Grinding mills in New York (state)
National Register of Historic Places in Cayuga County, New York